The École Technique Officielle was a Salesian secondary school in Kigali, Rwanda. On April 11, 1994, during the 1994 Rwandan genocide, over 2,000 Rwandans were murdered by extremist militia.

This event is the subject of the movie Shooting Dogs (also called Beyond the Gates) by Michael Caton-Jones.

References

Buildings and structures in Kigali
Rwandan genocide
Schools in Rwanda
1994 disestablishments in Rwanda
Educational institutions disestablished in 1994